Mr Pullen is a species of flowering plants in the legume family, Fabaceae. It belongs to the subfamily Faboideae. It is the only member of the genus Euchilopsis.

References

Mirbelioids
Monotypic Fabaceae genera